Montmagny may refer to:

 Montmagny, Quebec, Canada
 Montmagny Regional County Municipality, Quebec
 Montmagny Seamount, Canada
 Montmagny (provincial electoral district) now part of Montmagny-L'Islet
 Montmagny, Val-d'Oise, a commune in France 
 Montmagny, Switzerland, a commune